Dezhkord Rural District is a rural district (dehestan) in Sedeh District, Eqlid County, Fars Province, Iran. At the 2006 census, its population was 7,438, in 1,703 families.  The rural district has 14 villages.

References 

Rural Districts of Fars Province
Eqlid County